Operation Nordmark ( also : operation 'Kirkwall' ) was a sortie of the German fleet directed against British shipping between Norway and Shetland between 18 and 20 February 1940.

Background 

In retaliation for the Altmark incident the Germans wanted to strike British shipping between Norway and Shetland. It was also hoped that it would help and encourage German ships abroad to run the British blockade and to return home. The operation would also cover the return of the Altmark to Germany, since the Germans did not knew at the time the tanker was beached and could not sail yet.

Sortie 
The German batlle fleet consisting of battleships Scharnhorst and Gneisenau, the heavy cruiser Admiral Hipper and the destroyers Karl Galster and Wilhelm Heidkamp left Wilhemshaven on 18 February 1940 into the North Sea off Bergen, Norway. A third destroyer, Wolfgang Zenker, was forced to turn back after sustaining damage from ice. The ships operated under the overall command of Admiral Wilhelm Marschall. The ships attempted to locate British merchant shipping, but the German ships were detected in time by air reconnaissance and found nothing. The ships returned to port on 20 February.

The destroyers Z1 Leberecht Maass, Z5 Paul Jacobi, Z6 Theodor Riedel and Z7 Hermann Schoemann together with the torpedo boats Seeadler and Luchs at first escorted the German ships into the North Sea, but were then sent to the Skagerrak on an equal fruitless operation.

In preparation of the operation six U-boats deployed in the region, are scouting for the German fleet. These boats did not find convoys but could sink some ships sailing independently :

  sank a ship on 11 February off Norway.
  sank 4 ships on 15 and 16 February off the Scottish coast.
 U-57 damages a straggler east of the Orkney Islands from a convoy on 21 February
  sank 2 ships east of the Shetland Islands and the Orkney Islands on 18 February.
  sank a ship off Kirkwall, Orkney, on 24 February 1940.

References 

 
 
 

North Sea operations of World War II